Vrishabhanu, also spelled as Brushabhanu, is a Yadava chieftain featured in Hindu scriptures. He is described as the father of the goddess Radha, who is the chief consort of god Krishna and also regarded as the incarnation of the goddess Lakshmi in Dvapara Yuga. According to the Padma Purana, Vrishbhanu was the chief of Barsana, and the owner of 10 lakh cows. In his previous birth as King Suchandra, Vrishabhanu is stated to have received a divine boon from Brahma to become the father of Lakshmi in the Dvapara Yuga.

Legend

Boon 
In his previous birth, Vrishbhanu was named as Suchandra and was married to Kalavati, the grand-daughter of Daksha Prajapati. After enjoying conjugal relations with Kalavati for a long time, Suchandra retired from his family life and went to the ashrama of sage Agastya. When Kalavati started crying because of being abandoned by her husband, Brahma granted a boon to her that she would reborn with her husband in her next life, and that both of them would be blessed with goddess Lakshmi (Radha) as their daughter.

Father of Radha 
As per the boon of Brahma, King Suchandra was reborn in the Dvapara Yuga as King Vrishabhanu in the land of Vraja. He married Kirtida (The rebirth of Kalavati), and goddess Lakshmi (Radha) was born as their daughter. 

According to a different legend, the birth story of Radha is similar to Sita, who was also an avatar of Lakshmi. When King Vrishabhanu went to take a bath in a pond, he saw a baby girl on a lotus flower in the pond, and took her to his home. The baby girl was named as Radha, and was accepted as the daughter of Vrishabhanu and Kirtida.

See also 
 Bhishmaka
 Janaka
 Nanda (Hinduism)

References

 Characters in Hindu mythology
Mythological Indian monarchs
People related to Krishna